The Rural Municipality of Blanshard is a former rural municipality (RM) in the Canadian province of Manitoba. It was originally incorporated as a rural municipality on December 22, 1883. It ceased on January 1, 2015 as a result of its provincially mandated amalgamation with the RM of Saskatchewan and the Town of Rapid City to form the Rural Municipality of Oakview.

It was located northwest of the city of Brandon.

Communities 
 Brumlie
 Cardale
 Norman
 Oak River

References 

 Manitoba Historical Society - Rural Municipality of Blanshard
 Map of Blanshard R.M. at Statcan

External links 
 

Blanshard
Populated places disestablished in 2015
2015 disestablishments in Manitoba